Seon may refer to:

 Seon, Switzerland, a municipality in the canton of Aargau
 Seon, a type of arranged marriage in South Korea
 Korean Seon, a Zen school of Korean Buddhism
 Seon (food), steamed vegetable dishes with fillings in Korean cuisine
 Seon (Korean name), including a list of people with the name
 Seon, Anglicisation of Gaelic forename Seán or Seathan (other Anglicisations include Sean, Shane, Eathain, Iain, and Ian, Shaun, and Shawn).
 Seon, like Sheehan, an Anglicised form Gaelic surname Ó Síocháin.